Gene Murphy may refer to:
 Gene Murphy (American football, born 1939) (1939–2011), American football player and coach
 Gene Murphy (American football, born c. 1900) (c. 1900–1976), American football player and coach